The men's synchronised 10 metre platform was part of the Diving at the 2014 Commonwealth Games program. The competition was held on 1 August 2014 at Royal Commonwealth Pool in Edinburgh.

Schedule
All times are British Summer Time (UTC+1)

Format
A single round was held, with each team making six dives.  Eleven judges scored each dive:  three for each diver, and five for synchronisation.  Only the middle score counted for each diver, with the middle three counting for synchronisation.  These five scores were averaged, multiplied by 3, and multiplied by the dive's degree of difficulty to give a total dive score.  The scores for each of the five dives were summed to give a final score.

Results
Final results:

 Only four teams were registered to compete in the men's synchronized 10 metre platform event, which resulted in only the gold and silver medals being awarded.

References

Diving at the 2014 Commonwealth Games